Klimczak is a Polish surname. Notable people include:

 Adrian Klimczak (born 1997), Polish footballer
 Karen Klimczak (1943–2006), American Catholic nun
 Krystyna Klimczak (born 1992), Polish figure skater
 Piotr Klimczak (born 1980), Polish sprinter

Polish-language surnames